Adel Abdullah (Arabic:عادل عبد الله) (born 6 June 1982) is an Emirati footballer.

References

External links
 

Emirati footballers
1982 births
Living people
Association football fullbacks
Hatta Club players
Al Dhafra FC players
Al Wahda FC players
Ajman Club players
Place of birth missing (living people)
UAE First Division League players
UAE Pro League players